Getxo is a town located in the province of Biscay, in the autonomous community of the Basque Country, in Spain.
It is part of Greater Bilbao, and has 77,946 inhabitants (2019). Getxo is mostly an affluent residential area, as well as being the third largest municipality of Biscay.

History
Getxo (formerly spelt Guecho) was a parish (elizatea, anteiglesia'), originally a rural area, including a large beach at the mouth of the Estuary of Bilbao, centered on the little fishing village of Algorta. The parish council met at the church of Getxoko Andra Mari (Basque) or Santa María de Getxo (Spanish) (both mean Saint Mary of Getxo), not far from the headland called Punta Galea.

The town's coat of arms has an oak with two cauldrons chained to its branches and the motto Kaltea Dagianak Bizarra Lepoan (Basque for "Who makes evil, the beard at the back").
It is a proverb meaning that the evil doers look back, fearing revenge.

With industrialisation in the 19th century, some parts of Getxo evolved into residential areas for the rich bourgeois class. A residential area called Neguri (Basque for "Winter Town") came into being. The village of Algorta grew around the church of Saint Nicholas (San Nicolás) and the canalisation of the firth, provided for the colonisation of the beach, where a district called Areeta in Basque and Las Arenas (Spanish for "The Sands") was built. Near Areeta / Las Arenas, on the other side of the road to Bilbao, there grew a working-class district called Erromo, similar to the one that grew near Neguri: Neguri Langile. Finally, in the 20th century, urban development reached the rural areas of Getxoko Andra Mari.

Getxo, as well as the surrounding area known as Uribe-Kosta, grew rapidly in the last decades of the 20th century. While in the early 1980s the town had only 50,000 inhabitants, it has now more than 83,000. The surrounding towns of Leioa, Berango and Sopelana have also multiplied their population in the same period.

Getxo was hit by the Basque Conflict several times, with the town being the location of many ETA attacks. The deadliest of these was an ambush in October 1978 when three civil guards were killed and the most recent the car bomb attack on May 19, 2008. Many activists of the organisation have been born in Getxo, such as Arkaitz Goikoetxea.

Geography
It is located 14 km (~8 miles) north of Bilbao, in the province and historical Territory of Biscay, in the community of the Basque Country, in the north of Spain. It borders in the north with Sopelana, in the east with Berango and Leioa, in the south with Portugalete and in the west with the Bay of the Cove.

Neighborhoods 
The municipality officially encompasses the neighborhoods of Las Arenas, Algorta, Romo, Neguri, and Santa María de Getxo. But for the inhabitants of Getxo there is a more thorough division:
 Las Arenas: Las Mercedes, Santa Ana, Zugazarte y Antiguo Golf.
 Neguri: Neguri, San Ignacio.
 Algorta: Algorta centre, Alango, María Cristina, Sarrikobaso, Arrigunaga, Villamonte, La Humedad, Aldapas, Fadura, Ereaga, Usategui, Portu Zaharra / Puerto Viejo (the Old Port, the original core of Algorta) and Bidezábal.
 Aiboa
 Santa María de Guecho / Getxoko Andra Mari: Aixerrota, Malakate, Punta Galea, Avenida del Ángel, La Venta y Azkorri.
 Romo

The founding nucleus of the town of Getxo, the elizate or anteiglesia is what currently is known as Santa María or Andra Mari, which was originally a group of country houses or "baserris" around Saint Mary's church.

Las Arenas and Neguri arose in the late nineteenth century as residential areas for the Basque industrial bourgeoisie. Neguri neighborhood is characterized by the palaces in which lived the elite of the bourgeoisie and where nowadays many of the people with more resources of Getxo live. The name of Neguri was coined by Resurrección María de Azkue, since previously it was called Aretxetaurre (before Aretxete). Neguri comes from the merger of two Basque words: negu and uri (winter and city respectively): Neguko hiri, Neguri, the winter city designed, as has been noted, for the Basque bourgeoisie.

The neighborhood of Algorta is the district of largest population of Getxo. The greatest expansion was in the 70s when middle-class families decided to find a more comfortable place to live rather than in the neighborhoods of the left bank of the Nervion.

Romo neighborhood was built in the beginning to house the working class, formerly separated by the train barriers from Las Arenas. Nowadyas is separated by Gobelas river from one side and reaches the traffic circle of Romo. Originally the district was shaped like a horseshoe. It borders the neighbourhood of Ibaiondo (which belongs to the municipality of Leioa), so much so that the road from the roundabout Romo until the bank of the estuary of Bilbao is the municipal border between Getxo and Leioa. One sidewalk belongs to each municipality.

The neighborhood of Santa María de Getxo stood longer as a mostly rural area until the last third of the 20th century. It still has several farmhouses, arable fields and pastures and but there are also many villas and houses built in the 1990s.

Historic monuments

Andra Mari Church
This romanesque church built in the 12th century took in the first inhabitants. This church suffered diverse reformations and the church that nowadays we can admire is mostly from the 17th century based on the Baroque period. Inside the church is a sculpture of the Virgin and her son.

Aixerrota Windmill
This monument is the only antique windmill that nowadays still stands. The construction of the windmill was undertaken between 1726 and 1727 due to a huge drought and was focused on corn and feed production. The windmill, ones in lack of use, was set up as a home during all the 19th century. The name of Aixerrota comes from basque Aixe "wind" and errota "mill". The construction of this windmill was motivated due to the drought that was originated in Biscay at the beginning of the 18th century. It produces two types of flour: fine and ordinary. The first historic date make reference to the windmill property is in 1725. This land belongs to the small village Subyaga-Etxebarria. Nowadays belongs to a catering company and has been completely restored. Also, has a restaurant and an art gallery.

 Prince's castle or La Galea Fort
This military building was constructed in the 18th century to protect the commercial traffic in Bilbao. Situated in a strategic place, this fort is located along the bay. "Galea" derives from the French word gale which means "cliff". This fort also was named "Prince´s Castle"; it is an interesting example of fortification, being a unique model of military construction in Biscay. The situation in which it is located in the past was privileged, thanks to the cliff, people could guard enemy fleets and could see the fleets that approached. In 1740, the council ordered Jaime Sycre to create the fort as a measurement to reinforce the coast. The historic datum holds that this fort was never attacked. When the military fort was abandoned, lighthouse construction started in 1782. Nowadays the fort is a municipal property.

Saint Anne's Chapel (Santa Ana)
In Las Arenas there are a number of buildings of the neogothic style in Biscay. By order of the Agirre family the chapel was built by Modesto de Echániz y Zavalla in 1864. Maximo Aguirre was a well-known business man that obtained lands in Las Arenas. Nowadays this chapel, is one of the best examples of neogotic in Biscay. It is located in an urban area, surrounded of little green spaces and in a peaceful place. In the construction of the chapel bishop demanded build a bell. The chapel is rectangular. Since 1864 to 1876 was the unique worship place in Las Arenas and nowadays belongs to Maximo Aguirre's family. Concretely it belongs to MS. Carmen Jauregui. Nowadays is not usually open and this chapel is used for weddings.

Vizcaya Bridge o El puente colgante
Located in Las Arenas it is the oldest bridge of its kind and it was designed by the architect Alberto Palacios y Elissague. It was built in 1893 with the purpose of communicating between both sides of the river and the municipalities of Getxo and Portugalete. It was made with the iron extracted from the mountains in the area and it is one of the main monuments from the industrial revolution, it is the main symbol of the region.

 Galerias de Punta Begoña 
This massive stone structure was built in 1919 as a continuation of Getxo's defensive wall. It's an impressive sight, though it's in a bad state of decay. Long-term restoration, however, is underway. And while it's not open to the public, free one-hour guided visits in Basque and Spanish are offered throughout the year, with some English-language tours in August.

These galleries and viewing balconies are of extraordinary architectural, visual and environmental interest. Their floor plan is irregular, following the outline of the Punta Begoña promontory on which they stand. A fort defending the bay stood on this same spot from the 17th century to the 19th.

The galleries were designed by architect Ricardo Bastida in 1918 in an eclectic but mainly classical style. They were commissioned by Horacio Echevarrieta, a renowned businessman, and their main function was complete the containing wall holding back the cliff below Atxekolandeta, the area on which the mansion of Echavarrieta family stood (this English-style mansion designed by architect Gregorio lbarreche in 1910, is no longer standing). The owner fitted out the galleries with various rooms and passages designed as a leisure area.

They are built in a blend of masonry, ashlars and concrete on a high sloping masonry base, and comprise three gallery sections at different heights, ending in terraces and balustraded viewing balconies.

Administration

Getxo's office of mayor has been continuously in the hands of the Basque Nationalist Party (EAJ-PNV) since democracy was restored in 1978 (Local Elections). Since 1991, the major opposition party has been the Partido Popular(PP). Other parties represented on the Town Council are the Socialist Party of Euskadi (PSE-EE) and the Elkarrekin Podemos alliance (EP).

Getxo has five different districts, which serve administrative and electoral purposes: Algorta, Las Arenas, Romo, Santa María de Getxo and Neguri.

Transport and tourism

It is possible to travel to Getxo from Bilbao using the city's modern underground Metro Bilbao, which has 6 stations along the neighborhoods (Areeta, Gobela, Neguri, Aiboa, Algorta, Bideazabal and Ibarbengoa). Getxo is also accessible from Portugalete, by means of both the Vizcaya Bridge transporter bridge and the regular fluvial transport over the Estuary of Bilbao.
The Bilbao Airport in Loiu is twenty minutes away from Getxo's town centre.

Getxo has some tourist appeal with easy access to four beaches and to the regional economic capital of Bilbao. It has a yacht harbour, a golf course, and several sports complexes (both public and private). A dynamic, semi-autonomous Department of Culture organises many events on a regular basis, including several international music festivals given over to jazz, the blues and folk.

The town has many houses of architectural interest, including the Town Hall and several churches, as well as private dwellings belonging to members of the wealthy industrialist class of Biscay. The Old Harbour district of Algorta and several parks with views across to the bay called the Bilbao Abra are also worth a visit.

Festivals
Several annual festivals are celebrated in Erandio. Some of them are fiestas patronales (patronage festivals, held in the days around the date dedicated to the patron saints under whose advocation churches and hermits are).
 Around May 15 (from May 14 to 18, in 2014), Saint Isidore the Laborer, in Andra Mari.
 From June 20 to 23, in Zubilleta
 June 23, Saint John the Baptist
 Near July 16 (from July 11 to 13 in 2014), Our Lady of Mount Carmel, in Neguri Langile.
 July 25 (Saint Jacques' day, a public holyday in the autonomous community of the Basque Country), contest of paellas (a Valencian rice dish) in the fields of Aixerrota.
 From July 25 to 27, Saint Anne, in Santa Ana
 Around July 31 (from July 30 to August 2 in 2014), Saint Ignatius of Loyola, in Algorta
 From August 6 to 10, in Romo / Itzubaltzeta
 From August 12 to 17, in the Old Port of Algorta.
 Around September 24 (19, 20 and 21 in 2014), Our Lady of Mercy, in Areeta / Las Arenas.
 Around November 9, Saint Martin of Tours, in La Humedad, Algorta.

Getxo also has festivals for Christmas season. Several neighbourhoods of Getxo celebrate marches with Olentzaros (in Christmas Eve, December 24). And there is a longer Cavalcade of Magi through Algorta and then Las Arenas on January 5.

Sport

Since 1924, the Circuito de Getxo (Getxo Circuit), a single-day road bicycle race, is held annually in July. Since 2005, the race has been organised as a 1.1 event on the UCI Europe Tour.

Every year one of the rowing clubs of Getxo organises a regatta of traineras called Flag of Getxo. Besides, other annual trainera competitions, like the Flag of Santurtzi, the Flag of Getxo and the Grand Prix of Nervión ara also held partly in waters of Getxo.

There are several association football clubs in Getxo. The most successful is the Arenas Club de Getxo football, which plays season 2015–2016 in Segunda División B, but they took part in the first ever national Spanish football league season, stood seven seasons in its First Division and won the 1919 Copa del Rey.

Getxo Rugby Taldea (currently Getxo Artea'') is the local rugby team and play in the División de Honor, former players include a Danish rugby international.

Getxo also has other clubs for golf, Basque traditional sports, Basque pelota, skating, hitch-hiking, cycling, sailing, basketball, surfing, fishing, athletics, triathlon, rhythmic gymnastics, handball, futsal, chess, tennis, paddle tennis, horse riding, hockey, boxing, and other sports.

Basque language
According to the City of Getxo, 48.56% of the citizens do not have enough knowledge of the Basque language, 19.9% speak good Basque and the remaining 31.5% understand but do not dominate.

On the other hand, the percentage of people who can speak Basque has increased from 9% in 1981 to 19.9% in 2001. According to the same source, only 4.83% of the population of Getxo uses Basque usually. This figure has grown since the previous measurements, especially among children (3.40% in 1989 to 4.68% in 1997) and youth (1.90% in 1989 to 5.15% in 1997).

This city also offers the possibility to learn the Basque language in several academies.

References

External links

 Pictures and news from Getxo 
 GETXO in the Bernardo Estornés Lasa - Auñamendi Encyclopedia (Euskomedia Fundazioa) 
 Getxo
 Getxo Futbola Futbol Eskola 
 getxorugby.org - Diese Website steht zum Verkauf! - Informationen zum Thema getxo rugby euskadi deporte tantaketa. 
 GETXO ARRAUN - Inicio 
 Another Biskayan accent: Getxo 
 Establishment and evolution of a landscape in the metropolitnan area of Bilbao, The case of Getxo 

 
Municipalities in Biscay
Populated coastal places in Spain